The British Rail Class 03 locomotive was, together with the similar Class 04, one of British Railways' most successful 0-6-0 diesel-mechanical shunters. 230 were built at Doncaster and Swindon works between 1957 and 1962, and were numbered D2000-D2199 and D2370-D2399 (later 03004 to 03399). D2370 and D2371 were used as departmental locomotives and originally numbered 91 and 92 respectively.

Overview
Like other shunters of this size, the Class 03 was built for light duties where a larger locomotive was not needed, especially for shunting at locomotive and carriage depots and as station pilots, or where larger or heavier locomotives could not be used. The reduction over time in the demand for shunting locomotives meant that they were progressively withdrawn from 1968 onwards, many being sold to private industry, including three that were exported to Belgium. However, some remained in service much longer, with two examples on the Isle of Wight lasting until 1993 (mainland examples had gone by 1987).

In 1998, one of the Isle of Wight locos, 03179, was reinstated by the West Anglia Great Northern for service at Hornsey depot. It was named Clive after a depot employee. It was not fitted with Train Protection & Warning System equipment and thus confined to the depot from 2002. It was operated subsequently by First Capital Connect until withdrawal in 2008. In 2016 it was sold by Govia Thameslink Railway to the Rushden, Higham and Wellingborough Railway.

Technical details
The engine is a Gardner 8-cylinder, 4-stroke 8L3 of  connected to a Wilson-Drewry CA5 R7, 5-speed epicyclic gearbox with RF11 spiral bevel reverse and final-drive unit. Drive is through a jackshaft mounted beneath the cab, driving the wheels through coupling rods.

During their later life, some locomotives were fitted with dual (air and vacuum) brakes. These were 03059, 03063, 03073, 03078, 03084, 03086, 03089, 03094, 03112, 03152, 03158, 03162, 03179, 03180, 03197, 03371, 03397 and 03399.

Operation

Shunting
Originally the Class 03s were often deployed where their attributes of short wheelbase and light weight enabled them to operate where other shunters could not. On lines such as that to Ipswich docks, bridge weight restrictions prevented the ubiquitous Class 08s from operating. Another common use was as station pilot, usually coupled to a shunters' truck to ensure operation of track circuits which did not always register the passage of the 03 due to its short wheelbase.

By 1979, Class 03s' operations included:
 Depot pilot duties at Hull Botanic Gardens DMU depot and Bradford Hammerton Street DMU depot
 Docks at Ipswich, Kings Lynn, and Poplar, London
 Freight trips along the Team Valley branch (Gateshead) and the Gwendraeth Valley line
 Shunting duties at Boston Yard, Ipswich Upper and Lower yards, Lincoln engineers' yard, and Tweedmouth yard near Berwick-upon-Tweed
 Spare loco on standby at Boston and Kings Lynn
 Motive power on the Kirkley goods branch line in Lowestoft
 Station pilot duties at Bradford Exchange, Hull Paragon, Ipswich, Newcastle Central, Norwich Thorpe, and Sunderland

Passenger duties
Despite the limited scope for the use of such a small locomotive on main line passenger duties, there were a number of duties rostered to the class. During the early 1970s Southern Region Class 03s worked Channel Island boat trains through the streets to the harbour along the Weymouth Quay tramway, displacing the last of the 1366 class 0-6-0 pannier tanks. In 1980 a class 03 at Ipswich was booked to shunt the 23:20 Peterborough – Liverpool Street onto the rear of the 23:45 Norwich – Liverpool Street. Also, according to Mangapps Railway Museum, 03089 once hauled a Blackpool to Scarborough express along the York to Scarborough Line from Malton to Scarborough.

Burry Port & Gwendraeth Valley Line
Several examples were rebuilt with cut-down cabs for working on the Burry Port & Gwendraeth Valley Line, as there were several low bridges on the line that precluded the use of normal height locomotives.

The modified examples were nos. 03119, 03120, 03141, 03142, 03144, 03145, 03151, 03152 and late addition (ex-Bristol) 03382. Their duties included shunting (for example at Burry Port), and hauling full coal trains down from the valley's pits. For this latter duty they sometimes worked triple-headed.

They were replaced by Class 08/9 locomotives, which were also rebuilt to a reduced height. Several cut-down locomotives have been preserved.

The Isle of Wight shunters, nos. 03079 and 03179, were also rebuilt with cut-down cabs, to enable them to pass through a low tunnel in Ryde.

Preservation
Fifty-six members of the class survive in preservation.

Loco numbers in bold mean their current number.

Model railways
Mainline Railways and Replica each offered OO gauge models. Mainline Railways introduced their OO gauge Class 03s in 1983; one in BR green and 03382 in BR blue. Mainline's original 'split-chassis' tooling later passed to Bachmann. When the company later took the decision to produce the Class 04 in its place the tooling was altered, retaining the split chassis power arrangement. However, Bachmann later announced that they would be producing a totally new 03 in OO gauge, including special edition examples of the Isle of Wight prototypes.

Graham Farish currently offers a British N gauge model. Past models have included D2388 in BR green livery and 03066 in BR blue livery.

Heljan currently offer a model in O gauge (7mm), which is available in BR green or rail blue with chevrons.

Notes

References

Sources

Further reading

External links

03
C locomotives
Railway locomotives introduced in 1957
Standard gauge locomotives of Great Britain
Shunting locomotives